Nurabad (also Romanized as Nūrābād; also known as Noor Abad, Sūrābād, and Nurbahar [نوربهار]) is a city in the Central District of Khodabandeh County, Zanjan province, Iran, and serves as capital of the county. At the 2006 census, its population was 3,260 in 699 households, when it was a village. The following census in 2011 counted 3,660 people in 1,087 households. The latest census in 2016 showed a population of 3,644 people in 1,056 households, by which time the village had been elevated to the status of a city.

References 

Khodabandeh County

Cities in Zanjan Province

Populated places in Zanjan Province

Populated places in Khodabandeh County